Robert Rockwell (October 15, 1920 – January 25, 2003) was an American stage, film, radio and television actor. He is best known for playing the handsome, but awkward biology teacher Philip Boynton in the radio and television sitcom Our Miss Brooks opposite Eve Arden.

Career 
A native of Lake Bluff, Illinois Rockwell studied at the Pasadena Playhouse, from which he obtained a master's degree. During World War II he enlisted in the US Navy for four years serving in Washington D.C. Dramatic roles often eluded him, however, after beginning his career as a contract player for Republic Studios he appeared, over his almost 50-year acting career, in more than 350 television episodes and, on stage, opposite José Ferrer in the 1946 Broadway production of Cyrano de Bergerac, and with Ginger Rogers during the 1960s in a San Diego production of Whitfield Cook's play A More Perfect Union. He appeared (uncredited) in the first Superman television show episode as Clark Kent's father, Jor-El in 1952. He appeared in The Millionaire in the 1958 episode "Millionaire Lee Randolph" as the title character. And, following year in the Perry Mason episode "The case of the Deadly Toy" as love interest to the defendant Claire Allison as Dick Benedict. He starred in the 1961 Perry Mason episode "The Case of the Misguided Missile" as an Air Force officer court-martialled on a murder charge. He later starred in the 1962 Perry Mason episodes "The Case of the Lurid Letter" as Everett Rixby, a high school principal, and the murderer Cole B. Troy in "The Case of the Shapely Shadow". He also appeared as Ed Purvis in the 1965 episode Perry Mason episode "The Case of the Candy Queen".  He also appeared on  Gunsmoke (1959) as Mr. Philips (S4E30).

Rockwell starred in his own ABC western-themed television series, The Man from Blackhawk in the 1959-1960 season. Rockwell was cast as the Blackhawk Insurance Company's key investigator, Sam Logan, who is assigned to weed out fraud in the payment of claims. He also played Sam Thompson in Thompson's Ghost, Tom Bennett in The Bill Cosby Show and Officer Russo in Adam-12.

In 1967, he played a littering tourist in the Lassie episode "Lassie's Litter Bit", an iconic episode which earned a trip for Lassie to the White House to shake hands with then First Lady "Ladybird" Johnson who had used the famous collie in her Keep America Beautiful Campaign.

Rockwell was a founding member of the California Artists Radio Theatre. He played standard leads in a couple of anti-Communist-era features, including Republic's The Red Menace (1949), in which he is cast as a returning veteran of World War II, who is duped by communists.

Later in his career, he appeared on episodes of Petticoat Junction (1970, episode: "Spare That Cottage", as Norbert Thompson), Growing Pains (1988–1990) and Beverly Hills, 90210 (1993). In 1981, he appeared as Uncle Henry on the Benson (https://en.m.wikipedia.org/wiki/Benson_(TV_series) episode "Marcy's Wedding".
His appearances in commercials and voiceovers totaled more than 200, most notably as the armchair grandfather treating his grandson to a piece of candy in the 1995 version of the Werthers Original candy spot.

Death 
On January 25, 2003, Rockwell died of cancer at his home in Malibu at the age of 82. He and his wife, Elizabeth (née Weiss), to whom he had been married since 1942, had five children.

Filmography

References

External links 

1920 births
2003 deaths
20th-century American male actors
American male film actors
American male stage actors
American male radio actors
American male television actors
Deaths from cancer in California
Male actors from Chicago
Male Western (genre) film actors
People from Lake Bluff, Illinois